Docomo Pacific is a wholly owned subsidiary of Japanese mobile phone operator NTT Docomo headquartered in Tamuning, Guam. It is the largest provider of mobile, television, internet and telephone services to the United States territories of Guam and the Northern Mariana Islands.

The company was formed through the merger of cell phone carriers Guamcell Communications and HafaTel and was acquired in December 2006 by NTT Docomo, a spin-off of Japanese communication company Nippon Telegraph and Telephone. In October 2008, Docomo Pacific was the first company on Guam to introduce a HSDPA network. In November 2011, Docomo Pacific launched 4G HSPA+ service on Guam followed by the launch of advanced 4G LTE service in October 2012.

In May 2013, Docomo Pacific acquired cable company MCV Broadband (Marianas Cable Vision Broadband) from Seaport Capital, an investment company based in New York City.

See also 
 Communications in Guam

References 

Cable television companies of the United States
Broadband
Companies of Guam
Mass media in Guam
Nippon Telegraph and Telephone
NTT Docomo